La Ribambelle (French for "flock" or "throng") is a Belgian comics series about a gang of kids living in the same neighbourhood. There were two versions of this strip: Joseph Loeckx (better known under the pen-name of "Jo-El Azara") drew a one-off story in 1958, but the longer-lasting version was that of Jean Roba (best known for Boule et Bill) who created a whole new set of characters who came from various countries and ethnic backgrounds but lived in the same city. They played in a local yard and even had adventures abroad. Others who contributed to the strip included writers Vicq, Maurice Tillieux and artist Jidéhem.

Roba's version was published in Spirou magazine between 1962 and 1975 and in book form.

Publication history

Inspirations
In the 1920s, the Sunday pages of American artist Martin Branner's Winnie Winkle the Breadwinner focused on the adventures of her little brother Perry and his gang the Rinkydinks, which included a Chinese boy called Chink. Their stories proved very popular in Europe. Perry was renamed Bicot for the French market and European artists made new comics about him and the Rinkydinks when Branner's weekly pages were no longer sufficient. The Our Gang films were also popular and featured African-American kids as well as whites. Among the Belgian children who enjoyed these series were André Franquin and Jean Roba.

Early version
By 1957 Franquin was a leading artist and contributor to Belgian comics. Artist Joseph Loeckx asked him for advice on a series that could get him work at Spirou magazine. Franquin suggested a gang of kids similar to Branner's Rinkydinks, coming up with the name "Ribambelle" (French for "flock" or "throng"), which "sounded right". A lover of jazz, Franquin also suggested that Loeckx include a black boy trumpeter called Dizzi, named after Dizzy Gillespie.

Based on a script by Marcel Denis, Loeckx, under the pen-name Joël, drew a four-page strip called Opération ciseaux (French for "Operation Scissors"). The gang's HQ was an old shack in a neighbourhood yard. Most of them appeared to be in their teens and included Tony, the blond-haired leader; Filasse, the artist; Michette, the fiery and heavy-handed only girl; Michel, the slingshot champion; Dizzi, the musician; and a much younger boy whose name was not mentioned.

Published in issue 1041 of Spirou magazine in March 1958, it was drawn in a ligne claire style more usually associated with the rival Tintin magazine; Loeckx having been influenced early in his career by Tintin contributor Willy Vandersteen. Soon afterwards, Loeckx joined the staff of Tintin, where he became best known under the pen-name Jo-El Azara, and the strip, after just one story, became dormant.

Roba version
A few years later, at Franquin's suggestion, artist Jean Roba started his own series called La Ribambelle but changed most of the characters, giving them varied nationalities and racial backgrounds, the only connection to Loeckx's original being Dizzi. The thorns in their sides were the Caïmans, a trio of rough boys described as "more stupid than nasty".

Their first adventure, La Ribambelle gagne du terrain (French for "The Ribambelle Gains Ground"), started publication in Spirou  magazine issue 1247 in early March 1962 and was published in book form in 1965. Several adventures were published in this way until 1975 when Roba dropped the strip and stuck to his more popular Boule et Bill series. The stories have occasionally been republished in Spirou and omnibus editions of their adventures came out in 2004.

A new adventure of the Ribambelle was published in 2011, written by Zidrou (pen-name of Benoît Drousie), best known for L'Élève Ducobu, and drawn by Jean-Marc Krings.

Characters

The Ribambelle
The Ribambelle is a gang of friendly kids who attend the same school in a typical mainland European town, probably in France. They hang out in a local yard, their HQ being a battered, abandoned bus. To ensure their privacy, a variety of hidden traps have been laid around the ground to discourage intruders.

Phil: the leader of the group, blond-haired and very supportive of his friends.

Dizzy: a keen trumpeter and jazz fan. His father is part of an orchestra.

Archibald MacDingelling: a Scot from a wealthy family, who lives in a large house with his butler James. He wears glasses and a school uniform, and often a kilt. He can be a bit of a know-all, but the others like him anyway. Technically minded, it was he who installed the traps in the yard but they are so well hidden that even he forgets where they are. Archibald is easily offended, especially when called an Englishman. His father works abroad but sends him letters: white sheets of paper for good news and black sheets for bad, thus saving on ink.

Grenadine: the only girl member, she is of a practical nature, often darning the boys' socks and other clothes torn during play. She also has a first aid box on standby during fights with the Caïmans, though it is usually they rather than her friends who require aspirin and bandages. When the boys divide into groups as part of their games, she usually serves as arbiter. Grenadine is a French soft-drink, popular among young children.

Atchi and Atcha: twin Japanese boys who dress alike and often talk in unison, using lengthy monologues and Japanese "quotations" to describe their observations. They are Judo champions, something that the Caïmans, and even bigger opponents, have learned at their expense.

James Jollygoodfellow: the MacDingelling butler. He looks after Archibald and they are very close. James is himself a Scot and is the epitome of the stiff-upper lip manservant, often putting on airs but remaining friendly and good-humoured and well liked by the children. He escorts them on their journeys abroad, making him almost a de facto member.

The Caïmans
A trio of local bullies who try to impose themselves on the neighbourhood. They hang out in a garage and wear leather jackets with pictures on the back of the animal they call themselves after. Tatane is the leader (despite to be the smallest) and likes to refer to himself as such. The others, Rodolphe and Alphonse, are in awe of him, even when his plans go disastrously wrong, and he addresses them as "mes p'tit gars" ("me little laddies"), even though he is half their size. Tatane has one aim in life: to get the "Ribabies... under my boot".

The Caïmans are often in league with Grofilou (French for "Bigrascal"), a crooked businessman. Grofilou is feared by most of the town — but not by the Ribambelle, who stand up to him and his rotten ways.

Stories
The adventures of the Ribambelle have not been published in English. Below is a list of the French titles, their year of publication, an English translation of the titles and a brief description. They are listed in order of publication.

References

External links
Ribambelle at bdoubliees.com
site (in French) on la Ribambelle
Les objets dérivés "La Ribambelle", objects derived from the Ribambelle

Dupuis titles
Belgian comics characters
Belgian comics titles
Belgian comic strips
Child characters in comics
1962 comics debuts
Humor comics
Adventure comics
Comics characters introduced in 1962
Fictional Belgian people
Male characters in comics
Female characters in comics
Black people in comics
Comics set in Belgium